George Donaldson Brown (8 May 1928 – 22 October 2011) was a Scottish footballer. He won the 1955 Scottish Cup with Clyde. He was born in Airdrie. He died on 22 October 2011 and was survived by his wife Maureen and family. His son Duggie Brown also played in the Football League, for Sheffield United.

References

External links

1928 births
2011 deaths
Footballers from Airdrie, North Lanarkshire
Association football inside forwards
Scottish footballers
Kilmarnock F.C. players
Airdrieonians F.C. (1878) players
Southport F.C. players
Stenhousemuir F.C. players
Hamilton Academical F.C. players
Clyde F.C. players
Bradford (Park Avenue) A.F.C. players
Scottish Football League players
English Football League players
Larkhall Thistle F.C. players
Poole Town F.C. players